Delias bakeri is a butterfly in the family Pieridae. It was described by George Hamilton Kenrick in 1909. It is found in New Guinea (Arfak Mountains).

References

External links
Delias at Markku Savela's Lepidoptera and Some Other Life Forms

bakeri
Butterflies described in 1909